Transmembrane protease, serine 11D is an enzyme that in humans is encoded by the TMPRSS11D gene.

This gene encodes a trypsin-like serine protease released from the submucosal serous glands onto mucous membrane. It is a type II integral membrane protein and has 29-38% identity in the sequence of the catalytic region with human hepsin, enteropeptidase, acrosin, and mast cell tryptase. The noncatalytic region has little similarity to other known proteins. This protein may play some biological role in the host defense system on the mucous membrane independently of or in cooperation with other substances in airway mucous or bronchial secretions.

References

Further reading

External links